Great Ormond Street is a British television documentary series. It was first broadcast on BBC Two on 6 April 2010. Each episode focuses on a different department at the Great Ormond Street Hospital for Children in London.

A second series aired in 2012. A third series aired in summer 2015.

Background

Great Ormond Street Hospital is a hospital specialising in the care of children in the district of Bloomsbury, Central London. It was founded in 1852 as the Hospital for Sick Children, making it the first hospital providing in-patient beds specifically for children in the English-speaking world. Today, the hospital still engages in pioneering work in children's medicine.

The hospital works with the UCL Institute of Child Health, and is the largest centre for research into childhood illness outside the United States and Canada, and a major international trainer of medical professionals.

This television series was filmed over the course of a year and features unprecedented access to health professionals as they make some of the hardest choices in medicine. In this series cameras followed Great Ormond Street Hospital's medical professionals into the meetings where they come face to face with the most difficult ethical dilemmas on a daily basis.

Episodes
The first series consisted of three one hour programmes and each episode focussed on a separate department within the hospital.
The second series consists of six episodes, also one hour long.
Series three (of three episodes) starts on 14 July 2015.

Series 1 (2010)

Series 2 (2012)

Reception
Great Ormond Street received positive reviews.
Tom Sutcliffe of The Independent wrote that the series was "distinguished by the attention it paid to the limits of medical expertise".
Ceri Radford writing for The Daily Telegraph called the series "excellent" and added that "the sensitivity of [the] programme saved it from feeling voyeuristic".
John Crace of The Guardian said that the documentary "exposed us to the existential questions that doctors face on a daily basis – and which most documentaries avoid", while Andrew Billen of The Times called it "extraordinarily frank". Jane Simon for The Daily Mirror said that the programme was "made with great sensitivity"  and Paul Whitelaw, writing for The Scotsman called the series "A sensitive study of tragedy and hope".

References

External links

Great Ormond Street Hospital website
 

2010s British documentary television series
BBC television documentaries
2010s British television miniseries
Documentary films about children
Great Ormond Street Hospital
2010s British medical television series
Television shows set in London
2010 British television series debuts
2015 British television series endings